The murder of Derrion Albert occurred on September 24, 2009 near Christian Fenger Academy High School on Chicago's South Side.

Events of September 24
Reports and video footage indicate that Albert was caught in a brawl between two factions of students at Christian Fenger Academy High school, from two neighborhoods, Altgeld Gardens and The Ville.
His death occurred after he was brutally beaten by several boys with pieces of a railroad tie.
Police initially arrested four individuals, Silvonus Shannon, Eric Carson, Eugene Riley, and Eugene Bailey, who were charged with first-degree murder. Charges were later dropped against Bailey after further investigations.

By 2011, five individuals had been convicted of Albert's death and sentenced to varying terms in prison: Shannon, Carson, Riley, Lapoleon Colbert, and a minor whose name was not publicized.

Public response
The amateur video footage of the beating, obtained by Chicago television station WFLD, was widely broadcast in both traditional and online media.
Largely resulting from the widespread circulation of this video, the story attracted much national attention within the United States, leading President Barack Obama to send U.S. Attorney General Eric Holder and Secretary of Education Arne Duncan to Chicago to discuss youth violence with Mayor Richard M. Daley.
Secretary Duncan was also interviewed by Anderson Cooper on the cable news channel CNN regarding violence in Chicago.

The murder and its subsequent coverage form an important part of the 2011 Steve James documentary The Interrupters, which profiles the work of the antiviolence organization CeaseFire. Rapper Nas also wrote an open letter to the Chicago youth. The letter can be found on Rap Genius. The murder also inspired a heartbreaking 2014 short film - written, directed and executive produced by first-time film director Derrick Sanders - called Perfect Day. The film starred a young Daniel Kyri (Chicago Fire TV series) as a Derrion composite called Desmond, and was co-produced by Jessica Estelle Huggins, and co-executive produced by Chadwick Boseman. The film was dedicated to Derrion's memory.

See also
List of murdered American children

References

External links

2009 in Illinois
Crimes in Chicago
Murder in Chicago
Filmed killings
Deaths by beating in the United States
Deaths by person in Illinois
2009 murders in the United States
September 2009 crimes in the United States
September 2009 events in the United States
Incidents of violence against boys